Petr Kazantsev (born 22 April 1998) is a Belarusian professional footballer who plays for Molodechno.

References

External links 
 
 
 Profile at FC Minsk website

1998 births
Living people
Belarusian footballers
Association football defenders
FC Minsk players
FC Belshina Bobruisk players
FC Smorgon players
FC Lida players
FC Molodechno players